Dieung Anak Manggang (born 11 April 1981) is a Malaysian former swimmer, who specialised in long-distance freestyle and in butterfly events. He is a single-time Olympian (2000), and a multiple-time SEA Games medalist (1999 and 2001).

At the 1999 Southeast Asian Games in Bandar Seri Begawan, Brunei, Manggang powered home with two gold medals each in the 400 m freestyle (4:00.34) and 1500 m freestyle (15:57.47).

Manggang competed in a long-distance freestyle double at the 2000 Summer Olympics in Sydney. After claiming two titles from the SEA Games, his entry times of 4:00.34 (400 m freestyle) and 15:57.47 (1500 m freestyle) were accredited under a FINA B-standard. On the first day of the Games, Manggang placed forty-third in the 400 m freestyle. Swimming in heat two, he rounded out the field to last place in 4:03.77, more than three seconds off his entry time. Nearly a week later, in the 1500 m freestyle, Manggang challenged five other swimmers in the same heat, including 18-year-old Jonathan Duncan of New Zealand. He held off Duncan by more than half the body length to take a third spot and thirty-sixth overall in a time of 16:02.11.

When his nation Malaysia hosted the 2001 Southeast Asian Games in Kuala Lumpur, Manggang won a total of three bronze medals each in the 200 m butterfly (2:05.70), 400 m freestyle (4:00.12), and 1500 m freestyle (15:55.73).

References

1981 births
Living people
Malaysian male swimmers
Olympic swimmers of Malaysia
Swimmers at the 2000 Summer Olympics
Malaysian male freestyle swimmers
Male butterfly swimmers
Southeast Asian Games medalists in swimming
Southeast Asian Games gold medalists for Malaysia
Southeast Asian Games bronze medalists for Malaysia
Competitors at the 1999 Southeast Asian Games
Competitors at the 2001 Southeast Asian Games